Black Radio is an album by Robert Glasper, recorded with his electric quartet, the Robert Glasper Experiment. Released on February 28, 2012, on the Blue Note label, the album won Best R&B Album at the 55th Grammy Awards and also received a nomination for Best R&B Performance from the album cut "Gonna Be Alright (F.T.B.)", which featured R&B singer Ledisi, in February 2013.

Track listing 

Notes
"Afro Blue" cover as performed by Mongo Santamaria.
"Cherish the Day" cover as performed by Sade.
"Gonna Be Alright (F.T.B.)" additional vocals of "F.T.B." from album In My Element as performed by Robert Glasper.
"Letter to Hermione" cover as performed by David Bowie.
"Smells Like Teen Spirit" cover as performed by Nirvana.
"A Love Supreme" cover as performed by John Coltrane.
"Twice" cover as performed by Little Dragon.

Black Radio Recovered: The Remix EP

Personnel 
The Robert Glasper Experiment
Robert Glasper — Keyboards, Piano, Fender Rhodes (Exc. tracks 10, 11), synthesizer (track 10), arrangements (tracks 2, 11, 12)
Casey Benjamin — Vocoder (tracks 1, 3, 4, 8, 12), flute (tracks 2, 11), saxophone (tracks 3, 6, 9, 10), synthesizer (tracks 3–5, 12), arrangement (track 8)
Derrick Hodge — Bass
Chris Dave — Drums, percussion
Jahi Sundance — Turntables (tracks 1, 8, 10, 12)
Stokley Williams — Percussion (track 9)

Featured Artists
Shafiq Husayn — Vocals (track 1)
Erykah Badu — Vocals (track 2, Remix EP track 1)
Lalah Hathaway — Vocals (track 3, 12)
Bilal — Vocals (track 4, 11, Remix EP track 5)
Lupe Fiasco — Vocals (track 4)
Ledisi	— Vocals (track 5)
KING (track 6)
Anita Bias — Vocals
Amber Strother — Vocals
Paris Strother — Keyboards
Chrisette Michele — Vocals (track 7)
Musiq Soulchild — Vocals, snapping (track 7)
MeShell Ndegeocello — Vocals (track 8, Remix EP track 3)
Stokley Williams — Vocals (track 9), percussion (tracks 9, 12)
Yasiin Bey — Vocals (track 10, Remix EP track 2)
Hindi Zahra — Vocals (European bonus tracks)
Phonte — Vocals (Remix EP track 1)
Solange Knowles — Vocals (Remix EP track 4)
The Roots — (Remix EP track 4)
Black Milk — Vocals (Remix EP track 5)
9th Wonder — Remixing (Remix EP track 1)
Pete Rock — Remixing (Remix EP track 2)
Georgia Anne Muldrow — Remixing (Remix EP track 3)
?uestlove — Remixing (Remix EP track 4)
DJ Jewels Baby	— Remixing (Remix EP track 5)

Production
Recorded at Threshold, Los Angeles, CA, by Keith Lewis, assisted by Todd Bergman.
Vocals and piano for "Afro Blue" recorded by Max Ross at Systems Two, Brooklyn, NY.
Mixed by Qmillion at Flying Dread STudios, Venice, CA.
Mastering by Chris Athens at Sterling Sound, New York, NY.
Produced by Robert Glasper, except track 7 co-produced by Bryan-Michael Cox 
Nicole Hegeman	— Executive producer, production coordination, management
Eli Wolf — Executive producer, A&R
Vincent Bennett — Management
Gordon H. Jee — Art direction
Giuliyani — Original artwork on cover
Michael Schreiber — Photography
Jewell Green — Photography
Cognito — Photography
Angelika Beener — Liner notes

Charts

Original charts

Remix charts

Year-end charts

References 

2012 albums
Robert Glasper albums
Blue Note Records albums
Grammy Award for Best R&B Album